Kodow (also Romanized as Kādū; also known as Kodo) is a village in Farmeshkhan Rural District, in the Central District of Kavar County, Fars Province, Iran. At the 2006 census, its population was 438, in 93 families.

References 

Populated places in Kavar County